The official and de facto national symbols of Afghanistan are as follows:

References

External links